James Forsyth may refer to:
James Forsyth (Australian politician) (1852–1927), Member of the Queensland Legislative Assembly
James Forsyth (college president) (1817–1886), attorney and president of Rensselaer Polytechnic Institute
James Forsyth (journalist) (born 1981), former political editor of The Spectator magazine
James Forsyth (sculptor) (1827–1910), Scottish sculptor
James Forsyth (traveller) (1838–1871), Indian traveller
James B. Forsyth (1809–1872), Massachusetts physician and politician
James Bell Forsyth (1802–1869), Quebec merchant and author
James W. Forsyth (1834–1906), U.S. Army officer and general
Jim Forsyth (born 1944), former Australian rules footballer 
Jimmy Forsyth (1904–1982), Scottish footballer, trainer and physiotherapist
Jimmy Forsyth (photographer) (1913–2009), British amateur photographer